Vsevolod Dmitriyevich Larionov (September 11, 1928 in Moscow, RSFSR, Soviet Union – October 8, 2000 in Moscow, Russia) was a Soviet and Russian stage and film actor. People's Artist of the RSFSR (1978).

Selected filmography 

 Fifteen-Year-Old Captain (1945) as Master Dick Sand
 Cruiser 'Varyag' (1946) as Dorofeyev
 Springtime (1947) as Gaffer (uncredited)
 Przhevalsky (1952) as Roborovsky
 Silvery Dust (1953) as Harry Steal
 The Poet (1957) as Sergei Orlovsky, anti-communist
 Street Full of Surprises (1958) as Vladimir Zvantsev
 The Twelve Chairs (1976, TV Mini-Series)
 38 Parrots (1976–1991, TV Series) as Parrot (voice)
 An Ordinary Miracle (1979, TV Movie) as hunter
 Siberiade (1979) as Fyodor Nikolaevich
 The Very Same Munchhausen (1979, TV Movie) as Judge
 Ogaryova Street, Number 6 (1981) as Proskuryakov
 The Mystery of the Third Planet (1981) as Seleznyov (voice)
 Dog in Boots (1981, Short) as Buckingham's Watch Dog (voice)
 Family Relations (1982) as general
 The House That Swift Built (1982, TV Movie) as Bigs, judge
 Anna Pavlova (1983, TV Series) as Sergei Diaghilev
 Demidovs (1984) as Ushakov 
 Alone and Unarmed (1984) as  Ivan Ivanovich Melentyev
 Peter the Great (1986, TV Mini-Series) as Prince Sukhorukov
 Dark Eyes (1987) as Pavel (Russian Ship Passenger)
 Prisoners of Yamagiri-Maru (1988, Short) as Aran Singh
 Intergirl (1989) as narrator (voice)
 Vaniusha The Newcomer (1990) as narrator (voice)
 Stalin's Funeral (1990) as Narrator (voice)
 Vaniusha and The Space Pirate (1991, Short) as narrator (voice)
 Crazies (1991) as Rozanov-Razdorskiy
 Stalin (1992, TV Movie) as Dr. Lukomsky
 Vaniusha and The Giant (1993, Short) as narrator (voice)
 Glasha and Kikimora (1992, TV Short) as The Black Cat (voice)
 The Russian Singer (1993) as Colonel Gavrilin
 The Master and Margarita (1994) as episode
 Repete (2000) as Khrunov (final film role)

References

External links
 

1928 births
2000 deaths
Male actors from Moscow
Communist Party of the Soviet Union members
Honored Artists of the RSFSR
People's Artists of the RSFSR
Recipients of the Order of Honour (Russia)
Recipients of the Order of the Red Banner of Labour
Russian male child actors
Russian male film actors
Russian male stage actors
Russian male television actors
Russian male voice actors
Soviet male child actors
Soviet male film actors
Soviet male stage actors
Soviet male television actors
Soviet male voice actors
Burials at Vagankovo Cemetery